Hamparan Perak is a town and district of Deli Serdang Regency in the province of North Sumatra, Indonesia. The population of the town was 14,157 in 2010  and 16,496 in 2020. It is the district capital of the Hamparan Perak district.

Hamparan Perak District
The district, which is geographically the largest district in Deli Serdang Regency, with an area of 262.88 km2 and a population of 163,521 at the 2020 Census, is composed of twenty 'villages' (many of which are suburban to the city of Medan), set out below with their areas and their populations at the 2010 Census and 2020 Census.

References

Sumatra
Populated places in North Sumatra